Suspended animation is the slowing or stopping of life processes without termination.

Suspended animation may also refer to:
Suspended animation in fiction, a trope in fictional works
Suspended Animation (The Monks album), 1981
Suspended Animation (John Petrucci album), 2005
Suspended Animation (Fantômas album), 2005
Suspended Animation (Esham album), 2010
Suspended Animation (film), 2001
Suspended Animation, Inc, an American company that coordinates cryopreservation

See also
Dormancy, a period in an organism's life when growth, development, or physical activity are temporarily stopped